Farinelli (24 January 1705 – 16 September 1782) was the stage name of Carlo Maria Michelangelo Nicola Broschi, a celebrated Italian castrato singer of the 18th century and one of the greatest singers in the history of opera. Farinelli has been described as having had soprano vocal range and as having sung the highest note customary at the time, C6.

Early years
Broschi was born in Andria (in what is now Apulia, Italy) into a family of musicians. As recorded in the baptismal register of the church of S. Nicola in Andria, his father Salvatore was a composer and maestro di cappella of the city's cathedral, and his mother, Caterina Barrese, a citizen of Naples. The Duke of Andría, Fabrizio Carafa, a member of the House of Carafa, one of the most prestigious families of the Neapolitan nobility, honored Maestro Broschi by taking a leading part in the baptism of his second son, who was baptised Carlo Maria Michelangelo Nicola. [In later life, Farinelli wrote: "Il Duca d'Andria mi tenne al fonte." ("The Duke of Andria held me at the font.")]. In 1706 Salvatore also took up the non-musical post of governor of the town of Maratea (on the western coast of what is now Basilicata), and in 1709 that of Terlizzi (some twenty miles south-east of Andria). Unlike many castrati, who came from poor families, Farinelli was well-to-do, and was related to minor nobility on both sides of the family.

From 1707, the Broschi family lived in the coastal city of Barletta, a few miles from Andria, but at the end of 1711, they made the much longer move to the capital city of Naples, where, in 1712 Carlo's elder brother Riccardo was enrolled at the Conservatory of S. Maria di Loreto, specialising in composition. Carlo had already shown talent as a boy singer, and was now introduced to the most famous singing-teacher in Naples, Nicola Porpora. Already a successful opera composer, in 1715 Porpora was appointed  at the Conservatory of S. Onofrio, where his pupils included such well-known castrati as Giuseppe Appiani, Felice Salimbeni, and Gaetano Majorano (known as Caffarelli), as well as distinguished female singers such as Regina Mingotti and Vittoria Tesi; Farinelli may well have studied with him privately.

Salvatore Broschi died unexpectedly on 4 November 1717, aged only 36, and it seems likely that the consequent loss of economic security for the whole family provoked the decision, presumably taken by Riccardo, for Carlo to be castrated. As was often the case, an excuse had to be found for this operation, and in Carlo's case it was said to have been necessitated by a fall from a horse. It is, however, also possible that he was castrated earlier, since, at the time of his father's death, he was already twelve years old, quite an advanced age for castration.

The text of this work was the first by the soon-to-be-famous Pietro Trapassi (known as Metastasio), who became a lifelong friend of the singer. Farinelli remarked that the two of them had made their debuts on the same day, and each frequently referred to the other as his  ("dear twin").

In this Serenata "Angelica e Medoro", the two leading roles were entrusted to two highly acclaimed singers: Marianna Benti Bulgarelli (aka "la Romanina") and Domenico Gizzi, Musico Soprano in the Royal Chapel of Naples.

The derivation of Broschi's stage name is not certain, but it was possibly from two rich Neapolitan lawyers, the brothers Farina, who may have sponsored his studies.

In 1722, he first sang in Rome in Porpora's Flavio Anicio Olibrio, as well as taking the female lead in Sofonisba by Luca Antonio Predieri. (It was common practice for young castrati to appear en travesti). All these appearances were greeted with huge public enthusiasm, and an almost legendary story arose that he had to perform an aria with trumpet obbligato, which evolved into a contest between singer and trumpeter. Farinelli surpassed the trumpet player so much in technique and ornamentation that he "was at last silenced only by the acclamations of the audience" (to quote the music historian Charles Burney). This account, however, cannot be verified, since no surviving work which Farinelli is known to have performed contains an aria for soprano with trumpet obbligato.

Career in Europe
 
In 1724, Farinelli made his first appearance in Vienna, at the invitation of Prince Pio di Savoia, director of the Imperial Theatre. He spent the following season in Naples. In 1726, he also visited Parma and Milan, where Johann Joachim Quantz heard him and commented: "Farinelli had a penetrating, full, rich, bright and well-modulated soprano voice, with a range at that time from the A below middle C to the D two octaves above middle C. ... His intonation was pure, his trill beautiful, his breath control extraordinary and his throat very agile, so that he performed the widest intervals quickly and with the greatest ease and certainty. Passagework and all kinds of melismas were of no difficulty to him. In the invention of free ornamentation in adagio he was very fertile." Quantz is certainly accurate in describing Farinelli as a soprano, since arias in his repertoire contained the highest notes customarily employed by that voice during his lifetime: "Fremano l'onde" in Pietro Torri's opera Nicomede (1728) and "Troverai se a me ti fidi" in Niccolò Conforto's La Pesca (1737) both have sustained C6. His low range apparently extended to F3, as in "Al dolor che vo sfogando", an aria written by himself and incorporated in a pasticcio called Sabrina, and as in two of his own cadenzas for "Quell' usignolo innamorato" from Geminiano Giacomelli's Merope.

Farinelli sang at Bologna in 1727, where he met the famous castrato Antonio Bernacchi, twenty years his senior. In a duet in Orlandini's Antigona, Farinelli showed off all the beauties of his voice and refinements of his style, executing a number of passages of great virtuosity, which were rewarded with tumultuous applause. Undaunted, Bernacchi repeated every trill, roulade, and cadenza of his young rival, but performing all of them even more exquisitely, and adding variations of his own.

In 1728, as well as performing in Torri's Nicomede at the Munich court, Farinelli performed another concert before the Emperor in Vienna. In 1729, during the Carnival season in Venice, he sang in two works by Metastasio: as Arbace in Metastasio's Catone in Utica (music by Leonardo Leo) and Mirteo in Semiramide Riconosciuta (music by Porpora).
In these important drammi per musica, performed at the Teatro San Giovanni Grisostomo of Venice, at his side sang some great singers: Nicola Grimaldi, detto Nicolino, Lucia Facchinelli, Domenico Gizzi (aka Virtuoso della Cappella Reale di Napoli), and Giuseppe Maria Boschi.

During this period he could really do no wrong. Loaded with riches and honors, he was so famous and so formidable as a performer that his rival and friend, the castrato Gioacchino Conti ("Gizziello") is said to have fainted away from sheer despondency on hearing him sing. George Frideric Handel was also keen to engage Farinelli for his company in London, and while in Venice in January 1730, tried unsuccessfully to meet him.

In 1731, Farinelli visited Vienna for a third time. There he was received by the Holy Roman Emperor, Charles VI, on whose advice, according to the singer's first biographer, Giovenale Sacchi, he modified his style, singing more simply and emotionally. After further seasons in Italy, and another visit to Vienna, during which he sang in oratorios in the Imperial chapel, Farinelli came to London in 1734.

Farinelli in London
In London the previous year, Senesino, a singer who had been a part of Handel's "Second Academy" which performed at the King's Theatre, Haymarket, quarrelled with Handel and established a rival company, the Opera of the Nobility, operating from a theatre in Lincoln's Inn Fields.  This company had Porpora as composer and Senesino as principal singer, but had not been a success during its first season of 1733–34.  Farinelli, Porpora's most famous pupil, joined the company and made it financially solvent.

He sang the memorable arias "Per questo dolce amplesso" (music by Hasse) and "Son qual nave" (music by Broschi), while Senesino sang "Pallido il sole" (music by Hasse). Of "Per questo dolce amplesso," Charles Burney reports: "Senesino had the part of a furious tyrant, and Farinelli that of an unfortunate hero in chains; but in the course of the first air, the captive so softened the heart of the tyrant, that Senesino, forgetting his stage-character, ran to Farinelli and embraced him in his own." "Son qual nave," on the other hand, was composed by Riccardo Broschi as a special showpiece for his brother's virtuosic skills. Burney described it thus: "The first note he  was taken with such delicacy, swelled by minute degrees to such an amazing volume, and afterwards diminished in the same manner to a mere point, that it was applauded for full five minutes. After this he set off with such brilliancy and rapidity of execution, that it was difficult for the violins of those days to keep pace with him." In 1735 Farinelli and Senesino also appeared in Nicola Porpora's Polifemo.

Both the cognoscenti and the public adored him. The librettist Paolo Rolli, a close friend and supporter of Senesino, commented: "Farinelli has surprised me so much that I feel as though I had hitherto heard only a small part of the human voice, and now have heard it all. He has besides, the most amiable and polite manners ...." Some fans were more unrestrained: one titled lady was so carried away that, from a theatre box, she famously exclaimed: "One God, one Farinelli!" and was immortalised in a detail of Plate II of William Hogarth's "A Rake's Progress" (she may also appear in Plate IV of his series "Marriage à la mode" of 1745).

Though Farinelli's success was enormous, neither the Nobility Opera nor Handel's company was able to sustain the public's interest, which waned rapidly. Though his official salary was £1500 for a season, gifts from admirers probably increased this to something more like £5000, an enormous sum at the time. Farinelli was by no means the only singer to receive such large amounts, which were unsustainable in the long term. As one contemporary observer remarked: "within these two years we have seen even Farinelli sing to an audience of five-and-thirty pounds." Nonetheless, he was still under contract in London in the summer of 1737 when he received a summons, via Sir Thomas Fitzgerald, Secretary of the Spanish Embassy there, to visit the Spanish court.

At the court of Spain

Apparently intending to make only a brief visit to the Continent, Farinelli called at Paris on his way to Madrid, singing on 9 July at Versailles to King Louis XV, who gave him his portrait set in diamonds, and 500 louis d'or. On 15 July he left for Spain, arriving about a month later. Elisabetta Farnese, the Queen, had come to believe that Farinelli's voice might be able to cure the severe depression of her husband, King Philip V (some contemporary physicians, such as the Queen's doctor Giuseppe Cervi, believed in the efficacy of music therapy). He never sang again in public.

Farinelli became a royal favourite and very influential at court. For the remaining nine years of Philip's life, Farinelli gave nightly private concerts to the royal couple. He also sang for other members of the royal family and organised private performances by them, and by professional musicians in the royal palaces. In 1738 he arranged for an entire Italian opera company to visit Madrid, beginning a fashion for opera seria in the Spanish capital. The Coliseo of the royal palace of Buen Retiro was remodelled, and became Madrid's only opera house.

On the accession of Philip's son, Ferdinand VI, Farinelli's influence became even greater. Ferdinand was a keen musician, and his wife, Barbara of Portugal, more or less a musical fanatic (in 1728 she had appointed Domenico Scarlatti as her harpsichord teacher; the musicologist Ralph Kirkpatrick acknowledges Farinelli's correspondence as having provided "most of the direct information about Scarlatti that has transmitted itself to our day"). The relationship between singer and monarchs was personally close: he and the queen sang duets together, and the king accompanied them on the harpsichord. Farinelli took charge of all spectacles and court entertainments. He was himself also officially received into the ranks of the nobility, being made a Knight of the Order of Calatrava in 1750, an honour of which he was enormously proud. Although much courted by diplomats, Farinelli seems to have kept out of politics.

Retirement and death

In 1759, Ferdinand was succeeded by his half-brother Charles III, who was no lover of music. Charles was the son of Elisabetta Farnese, who had never forgiven Farinelli for his decision to remain at court after Philip V's death, rather than following her into internal exile. It was clear that Farinelli would now have to leave Spain, though he was allowed a generous state pension. He retired to Bologna, where in 1732 he had acquired a property and citizenship. Though rich and still famous, much feted by local notables and visited by such notable figures as Burney, Mozart, and Casanova, he was lonely in his old age, having outlived many of his friends and former colleagues. One distinguished friend of his latter years was the music historian, Giovanni Battista (known as "Padre") Martini. He also continued his correspondence with Metastasio, court poet at Vienna, dying a few months after him. In his will, dated 20 February 1782, Farinelli asked to be buried in the mantle of the Order of Calatrava, and was interred in the cemetery of the Capuchin monastery of Santa Croce in Bologna. His estate included gifts from royalty, a large collection of paintings including works by Velázquez, Murillo, and Jusepe de Ribera, as well as portraits of his royal patrons, and several of himself, one by his friend Jacopo Amigoni. He also had a collection of keyboard instruments in which he took great delight, especially a piano made in Florence in 1730 (called in the will ), and violins by Stradivarius and Amati.

Farinelli died in Bologna on 16 September 1782. His original place of burial was destroyed during the Napoleonic wars, and in 1810 Farinelli's great-niece Maria Carlotta Pisani had his remains transferred to the cemetery of La Certosa in Bologna. Maria Carlotta bequeathed many of Farinelli's letters to Bologna's University Library and was buried in the same grave as Farinelli in 1850.

Farinelli's remains were disinterred from the Certosa cemetery on 12 July 2006. Having been piled together at one end of Maria Carlotta's grave for almost two centuries, the bones had suffered considerable degradation, and there was no sign of the singer's mantle of the Order of Calatrava. However, the surviving remains included his jawbone, several teeth, parts of his skull, and almost all of the major bones. (The exhumation was instigated by Florentine antiquarian Alberto Bruschi and Luigi Verdi, Secretary of the Farinelli Study Centre.) The next day the musicologist Carlo Vitali of the Farinelli Study Centre stated that the major bones were "long and sturdy, which would correspond with Farinelli's official portraits, as well as the castrato's reputation for being unusually tall." Maria Giovanna Belcastro of the Anthropology Institute of Bologna University, Gino Fornaciari, paleoanthropologist of the University of Pisa, and David Howard, Professor of Music Technology at the University of York, England, are engaged in ascertaining what new information may be derived from these remains as to Farinelli's lifestyle, habits and possible diseases, as well as the physiology of a castrato. Their research methods will include X-rays, CAT scans, and DNA sampling.

Farinelli's other musical activities
Farinelli not only sang, but like most musicians of his time, was a competent harpsichordist. In old age, he learned to play the viola d'amore. He occasionally composed, writing a cantata of farewell to London (entitled , for which he also wrote the text), and a few songs and arias, including one dedicated to Ferdinand VI.

Vocal works
Ossequiosissimo ringraziamento 
La partenza
Orfeo – with Riccardo Broschi
Recitative: Ogni di piu molesto dunque
Recitative: Invan ti chiamo
Aria: Io sperai del porto in seno	 	
Aria: Al dolor che vo sfogando		
Aria: Non sperar, non lusingarti	
Aria: Che chiedi? Che brami?

The artist and his times
Farinelli is widely regarded as the greatest, most accomplished, and most respected opera singer of the "castrato" era, which lasted from the early 1600s into the early 1800s, and while there were a vast number of such singers during this period, originating especially from the Neapolitan School of such composers as Nicola Porpora, Alessandro Scarlatti, and Francesco Durante, only a handful of his rivals could approach his skill as a singer. Caffarelli, Matteuccio, Siface, Senesino, Gizziello, Marchesi, Carestini, and some others were very famous and extremely gifted in their own right, with Caffarelli probably being the most vocally proficient – but Farinelli was also admired for his modesty, his intelligence, his "low-key" attitude, and his dedication to his work. He respected his colleagues, composers, and impresarios, often earning their lifelong friendship as a result, whereas Caffarelli was notoriously capricious, malicious, and disrespectful of anyone sharing the stage with him, to the point of cackling and booing fellow singers during their own arias.

Farinelli's technical proficiency allowed him to be comfortable in all vocal registers, from tenor to soprano, but he himself favoured the medium-to-high register rather than the very high, preferring to convey emotion rather than to astonish by sheer technique (unlike most of his colleagues who preferred to startle audiences with vocal stunts). This "soft" approach to music no doubt helped him survive his 22-year private engagement at the court of Spain, which effectively ended his theatrical career when aged only 32. By this time he had already achieved every possible success on every European stage, and, even in retirement in Bologna, was still regarded, by every foreign dignitary visiting the city, as "the" music star to meet.

Farinelli Study Centre
Farinelli lived in Bologna from 1761 until his death. The Farinelli Study Centre was opened in Bologna in 1998, Major events and achievements in which it was involved have included -
 The restoration of Farinelli's grave in the Certosa of Bologna (2000)
 An historical exhibition  (2001 and 2005)
 The inauguration of a City Park in the name of Farinelli, near the site where the singer lived in Bologna (2002)
 An international symposium  on the occasion of Farinelli's 300th anniversary of his birth (2005)
 An official publication  (2005)
 The disinterment of Farinelli at the Certosa of Bologna (2006)

Portrayals of Farinelli
Farinelli is represented in Voltaire's Candide.

A film, Farinelli, directed by Gérard Corbiau, was made about Farinelli's life in 1994. This takes considerable dramatic licence with history, emphasising the importance of Farinelli's brother and reducing Porpora's role, while Handel becomes an antagonist; the singer's 22 years spent in the Spanish court is only vaguely hinted at, as well as his brother being appointed minister of War. Farinelli's supposed sexual escapades are a major element of the film's plot, and are totally spurious according to historians (primarily, Patrick Barbier's "Histoire des castrats", Paris 1989). The movie is largely fictionalized and bears little resemblance to the historical Farinelli.

In opera:  Farinelli is a character in the opera , composed by Daniel Auber to a libretto by Eugène Scribe; the title-role in the opera Farinelli by the English composer John Barnett, first performed at Drury Lane in 1839, where his part is written for a tenor (this work is itself an adaptation of the anonymous , premiered in Paris in 1835).

Composer and performer Rinde Eckert gives Farinelli's time in Spain a contemporary treatment in his 1995 work for radio, Four Songs Lost in a Wall, commissioned by New American Radio.

That period in his life is also the setting for Farinelli and the King (the king in question being Philip V of Spain), a play by Claire van Kampen, which premiered at the Sam Wanamaker Playhouse from 11 February to 7 March 2015. It was transferred to the Duke of York's Theatre in London's West End in the final months of 2015, with the role of Farinelli doubled between speaking and singing, with Iestyn Davies performing the latter. Kampen's Farinelli and the King was performed on Broadway at the Belasco Theatre from 5 December 2017, to 25 March 2018.

Farinelli is portrayed by Raúl Ferrando in the episode "Fly Away" of the 2021 Netflix Original Series "The Cook of Castamar".

Notes

References
Specific

General
 Carlo Broschi Farinelli, Carlo Vitali (a cura di), La Solitudine amica. Lettere al conte Sicinio Pepoli, prefazione e collaborazione di Francesca Boris, con una nota di Roberto Pagano, Sellerio, 2000.
 
 Farinelli (British Journal for Eighteenth-Century Studies, vol 28, no 3; Oxford, 2005); the most recent collection of articles about the singer
 Cappelletto, S:  (Turin, 1995); the most recent biography of the singer
 Celletti, R: , (Fiesole, 1983), pp. 80–83, 100, 103, 104, 106, etc.
 Crow, C: Orchestration… Or Castration (History Today, September 2006; vol 56, no 9, pp 4–5)
 Haböck, F: Die Gesangkunst der Kastraten (Vienna, 1923), especially pp 12, 209 and 227, with reference to extremes of range
 Heriot, A: The Castrati in Opera (London, 1956), pp 95–110
 Pérez Samper, M A:  (Barcelona, 2003), pp 387–397
 Torrione, M., Crónica festiva de dos reinados en la Gaceta de Madrid: 1700–1759, Paris, Éditions Ophrys, 1998.
 Torrione, M., «La casa de Farinelli en el Real Sitio de Aranjuez. Nuevos datos para la biografía de Carlos Broschi», Archivo Español de Arte, n° 275, 1996, pp. 323–333.
 Torrione, M., «Farinelli en la corte de Felipe V», Torre de los Lujanes, n° 38, 1999, pp. 121–142.
 Torrione, M., «Felipe V y Farinelli, Cadmo y Anfión. Alegoría de una fiesta de cumpleaños: 1737», El conde de Aranda y su tiempo, Zaragoza, Inst. Fernando el Católico (CSIC), t. 2, pp. 223–250.
 Torrione, M., «Fiesta y teatro musical en el reinado de Felipe V e Isabel de Farnesio: Farinelli, artífice de una resurrección», El Real Sitio de La Granja de San Ildefonso: retrato y escena del rey, Madrid, Patrimonio Nacional, 2000, pp. 220–241.
 Torrione, M., «Decorados teatrales para el Coliseo del Buen Retiro en tiempos de Fernando VI. Cuatro óleos de Francesco Battaglioli», Reales Sitios, n° 143, 2000, pp. 40–51.
 Torrione, M., «El Real Coliseo del Buen Retiro: memoria de una arquitectura desaparecida», in Torrione, M. (ed.), España festejante. El siglo XVIII, Málaga, CEDMA, 2000, pp. 295–322.
 Torrione, M., «La sociedad de Corte y el ritual de la ópera», Un reinado bajo el signo de la paz. Fernando VI y Bárbara de Braganza: 1746–1759, Madrid, Real Academia de Bellas Artes de San Fernando, 2002, pp. 163–195.
 Torrione, M., «Nueve óleos de Francesco Battaglioli para el Coliseo del Buen Retiro. La ópera en el reinado de Fernando VI : último relumbrón de la Corte Barroca», J. Martínez Millán, C. Camarero Bullón, M. Luzzi (ed.), La Corte de los Borbones : crisis del modelo cortesano, Madrid, Polifemo, 2013, vol. III, pp. 1733–1777.
 Torrione, M., Francesco Battaglioli. Escenografías para el Real Teatro del Buen Retiro, Madrid, Real Academia de Bellas Artes de San Fernando, Teatro de la Zarzuela, INAEM, 2013.

External links 
 
 Carlos Broschi (sp) by Eugène Scribe
 
 Castrato superstar disinterred (Retrieved 8 May 2008)
 Castration Affected Skeleton Of Famous Opera Singer Farinelli, Archaeologists Say

1705 births
1782 deaths
Burials at Certosa cemetery
People from Andria
Castrati
Italian classical viola d'amore players
18th-century Italian male actors
Italian male stage actors
18th-century Italian male opera singers
Knights of Calatrava
Pupils of Nicola Porpora
Musicians awarded knighthoods